was an umbrella term used to refer to twelve limited express diesel multiple unit cars of similar specifications operated by Nagoya Railroad (Meitetsu) in Japan from 1965 to 1991. These cars were the recipients of the 9th Blue Ribbon Award held in 1966.

History
The KiHa 8000 series cars were built in two batches of six cars; six were built and delivered in 1965 and another six in 1969 for a total of twelve cars. The cars were based on the KiHa 58 series that had been in service with the Japanese National Railways (JNR) since 1961, and as such, share components such as engines and bogeys.

The trains were originally used on Takayama limited express services, to which it was quite difficult to reserve a seat for especially during peak periods due to various luxuries inside the KiHa 8000 series cars, such as air-conditioning. The Takayama service was renamed to Northern Alps in 1970, due to the opening of various stations on the line; despite this, the KiHa 8000 series cars were still used on those services.

However, by 1989, more advanced diesel multiple units were being developed by various manufacturers, and the obsolescence of the KiHa 8000 series cars were starting to show. All operations of the Northern Alps service were transferred to newer KiHa 8500 series diesel railcars by 1991, and the last few KiHa 8000 series cars were retired that same year.

No KiHa 8000 series cars survive today; all twelve cars were scrapped between 1985 and 1991.

Variants
 KiHa 8000 series
 KiHa 8050 series
 KiRo 8100/8150 series
 KiHa 8200 series

KiHa 8000 series
Two cars of this type, 8001 and 8002, were manufactured in July 1965. A third car, 8003, was manufactured in September 1969. Both cars had a single cab and were equipped with one engine. The cars were upgraded in 1976 with a room for a conductor. All three cars were scrapped between 1985 and 1990.

KiHa 8050 series
Two cars of this type, 8051 and 8052, were manufactured in July 1965. Both cars were intermediate cars with no cabs, and had two engines to cope with the steep grades of the Takayama Main Line. Both cars were scrapped between 1985 and 1990.

KiRo 8100/8150 series
One cab car, 8101, and one intermediate car, 8151, were manufactured in July 1965 for a total of two cars of this type. Both cars were "first-class" cars and came with reclining seats. Both cars were eventually downgraded to standard class cars 8101 and 8102, with the reclining seats being removed. The reclining seats from both of these cars were to be used for an upcoming train car, but they were never used due to plans for constructing the train falling through. Both cars were scrapped in 1985.

KiHa 8200 series
Five cars, numbered 8201 to 8205, were manufactured in September 1969. All five cars had a single cab and were equipped with two engines to cope with the steep grades of the Takayama Main Line, and were slightly longer and narrower than all other variants. The KiHa 8200 series cars were the longest lasting of all variants of the KiHa 8000 series, and were in service all the way from 1969 until their retirement in 1991. All five cars were scrapped in 1991.

References

This article incorporates information from the corresponding article in the Japanese Wikipedia.

Diesel multiple units of Japan
KiHa 8000 series
Train-related introductions in 1965
Nippon Sharyo multiple units